Chahe Township is a township in Eshan Yi Autonomous County, Yunnan, China. , it administers the following seven villages:
Qinghe Village
Pengzuba Village
Hewai Village
Wenshan Village
Anju Village
Yunmei Village
Xiezha Village

References 

Township-level divisions of Yuxi
Eshan Yi Autonomous County
Townships of Yunnan